Podgornaya is a rural locality (a village) in Ustyansky District, Arkhangelsk Oblast, Russia. The population was 46 as of 2010.

Geography 
It is located on the Sodenga River.

References 

Rural localities in Ustyansky District